Styphelia tortifolia is a small shrub species in the family Ericaceae. It is found in Western Australia.

Distribution 
It is found in Beard's south-western province.

Taxonomy 
The species was first described in 1845 as Astroloma glaucescens by Otto Sonder.   However, in 2020 phylogenetic studies by Darren Crayn, Michael Hislop and Caroline Puente-Lelièvre determined that Astroloma needed to be sunk into Styphelia. This resulted in the accepted (by the herbarium of Western Australia) description as Styphelia tortifolia by Crayn, Hislop and Puente-Lelièvre, since the name Styphelia glaucescens had already been used for a different plant species.

Etymology 
The specific epithet, tortifolia, derives from the Latin tortus (twisted) and folium (leaf), referring "to the longitudinally twisted leaves that are a common feature of this species."

References 

tortifolia

Flora of Western Australia
Plants described in 1845